Pondicherry Institute of Medical Sciences (PIMS, French: Institut des sciences médicales de Pondichéry) is a tertiary care hospital and teaching institute at Kalapet in the Union Territory of Puducherry, India. The college has been approved for full recognition by MCI for 150 seats for MBBS degree granted by the Pondicherry University. The PIMS is a unit of The Madras Medical Mission, a charitable society and hospital in Chennai promoted by the members of the Malankara Orthodox Christian community.

College administration 
The Office-bearers of The Madras Medical Mission are:
H.G Dr. Yuhanon Mar Diascoros, Bishop of Madras - Hon. President
Reji Abraham - Hon. Vice-President
M.M. Philip - Hon. Secretary and Chairman (PIMS)
E. John Thomas - Hon. Treasurer

The Hospital/Medical School is currently administered by Director-Principal Dr. Renu Gboy Varghese. Administrative Officers include:
Dean UG (Undergraduate Studies): Dr. Johnny Asir
Dean PG (Postgraduate Studies): Dr. Sheela Devi Bazroy
Dean Research: Dr. Reba Kanungo
Dean MEU: Dr. Subhasis Das
Registrar: Dr. Anil.J.Purty

Academics and courses 
PIMS has a Medical College, Multi-Specialty Hospital and a Nursing College.

PIMS Pondicherry offer more than 20 courses in medical stream including MBBS, MD, MS and M Ch in plastic surgery.  All these courses include undergraduate, post graduate and doctoral courses. It also has awards post graduate diplomas in many fields.

College of Nursing, PIMS 
College of Nursing (French: Collège des sciences infirmières), Pondicherry Institute of Medical Sciences was established in 2004 and is affiliated to Pondicherry University. It offers BSc and Msc in nursing.

References

External links 
 

Medical colleges in Puducherry
Educational institutions established in 2002
2002 establishments in Pondicherry
Hospitals in Puducherry
Universities and colleges in Pondicherry (city)